"Love on a Real Train" is a 1984 single by Tangerine Dream from the soundtrack for the film Risky Business. 
Critics have noted the influence of Steve Reich's Music for 18 Musicians on "Love on a Real Train".

The song has been featured on other film soundtracks including Noah Baumbach's The Squid and the Whale, the television series Mr. Robot, interactive Netflix film Black Mirror: Bandersnatch, and the Netflix movie The Babysitter: Killer Queen.

"Love on a Real Train" was voted one of the best 200 songs of the 1980s by Pitchfork magazine.

References

External links
Love on a Real Train: The Film Legacy of Tangerine Dream

1984 singles
1984 songs
1984 albums
Electronic songs
Synthesizers